A candelabra (plural candelabras) or candelabrum (plural candelabra or candelabrums) is a candle holder with multiple arms.

Although electricity has relegated candleholders to decorative use, interior designers continue to model light fixtures and lighting accessories after candelabra and candlesticks.  Accordingly, the term candelabra has entered common use to describe small-based light bulbs used in chandeliers and other lighting fixtures made for decoration as well as lighting.

In Judaism and in the Philippine religion Iglesia ni Cristo, the menorah is a special kind of candelabrum. The Candelabra is also used in certain Eastern Catholic and Eastern Orthodox church architecture and liturgy by bishops as the Trikiridikiri.

Singular and plural 
This word originally came from Latin, in which candelabrum is the singular form and candelabra is the plural.  Due to changes in English usage over time, the singular form of candelabra and the plural form of candelabras are now used more frequently.

History
An ancient example is the bronze candelabrum made by Callimachus for the Erechtheion in Athens, to carry the lamp sacred to Athena. In this case it is possible the lamp was suspended, as in the example from Pompeii; this consisted of a stalk or reed, the upper part moulded with projecting feature of the lamps, and a base resting on three lions' or griffins' feet; sometimes there was a disk at the top to carry a lamp, and sometimes there was a hollow cup, in which resinous woods were burnt. The origin of the term suggests that on the top of the disk was a spike to carry a wax or tallow candle ( or ). These consisted of a base, often triangular, and of similar design to the small sacrificial altars, and a shaft either richly moulded or carved with the acanthus plant and crowned with a large cup or basin. There is a fine example of the latter in the Vatican museums. The Roman examples seem to have served as models for many of the candelabra in the churches in Italy.

Candelabra antennas

In the United States and Canada, the word candelabra is used to refer to radio masts and towers with multiple transmission antennas. Sutro Tower in San Francisco and John Hancock Center in Chicago are examples of such structures. Baltimore's TV stations, WMAR-TV, WBAL-TV, and WJZ-TV in 1959 built the world’s first three-antenna candelabra tower, 730 feet tall. Other examples include the Mount Royal Candelabra in Montreal, the KXTV/KOVR/KCRA Tower, KSMO Candelabra Tower, KMBC/KCWE Candelabra Tower, the Madison Community Candelabra Tower in Madison.

See also
Candlestick
Chandelier
Girandole
Julleuchter
Ljuskrona
Menorah
Torchère
Charlottenburg Candelabra a pair of ornamental colonnades in west Berlin with a passing resemblance to candelabra

References

External links

 
Candles
Lighting
Antennas